The Texas Air & Space Museum is an aviation museum located near Rick Husband Amarillo International Airport in Amarillo, Texas. The museum displays civilian and military aircraft, as well as a wide range of air and space artifacts.

History
In 1989, a group of aviation enthusiasts in Amarillo formed an air and space museum at private Tradewind Airport in southeast Amarillo. In 1997, the museum moved from Tradewind Airport to the Amarillo International Airport (later Rick Husband Amarillo International Airport) and into old buildings that, for most of the years from 1929 through 1972, served as Amarillo's commercial air terminal, first as English Field, then as English Airport, and finally as Amarillo Air Terminal. When the ongoing maintenance costs of English Field's old terminal building and hangars became too great for the museum and city to bear, English Field Air & Space Museum relinquished 13 of its 14 aircraft to other museums, moved its artifacts into storage, and in 2007, closed its doors.

In February 2010, the museum changed its name to Texas Air & Space Museum, acquired indoor and outdoor exhibit space at the Rick Husband Amarillo International Airport, and reopened its doors. On opening day February 15, 2011, Texas Air & Space Museum had a significant number of indoor air and space historical displays and three aircraft—a North American P-51D Mustang, a de Havilland DHC-2 Beaver on floats, and a de Havilland DHC-4 C-7 Caribou.

In July 2011, the museum acquired the locally built and flown Speed Johnson F8F Beercat Reno racer, (registered as Speed Johnson F4F Bearcat) And, in September 2011, the museum acquired a NASA Gulfstream II Shuttle Training Aircraft  that was known by NASA as '946' and was flown 49 times by the airport's namesake—Rick Husband, commander of STS-107 Space Shuttle Columbia that on February 1, 2003, disintegrated upon re-entry, killing all crew members.

Exhibits

Outdoor aircraft park
de Havilland Canada C-7A Caribou
Grumman C-11A Shuttle Training Aircraft

Aircraft indoors

 Bell OH-13S Sioux 63-9085
 Douglas DC-3 N34
 Speed F4F Bearcat

Indoor exhibits
 Aviators of the past – covers local aviators who made aviation history throughout the area, state, nation, and world
 Airports of the past – describes neighboring airports that hosted airmen and aircraft of the early days of aviation
 Amarillo Army Airfield – documents the comings and goings of aircraft and aviators of the war years
 Harold English and English Field Airport – celebrates the dominant aviator and airfield of the area's early aviation
 Military Aviation – highlights aircraft and aviators of the war years while emphasizing service at nearby Amarillo Army Air Field later called Amarillo Air Force Base
 Model aircraft – displays models of civil and military aircraft: All models are hand made by World War II veteran, former B-17 tail gunner, and expert model creator, Jack Rude.

Space exploration
This section of the museum houses dedications to the space program and covers the period from the Mercury flights to the Space Shuttle.

References

External links

 Official Website

Aerospace museums in Texas
Museums in Amarillo, Texas